Katsumi Kaneko was born in Yokohama (Kanagawa), Japan. He graduated with a Bachelor of Engineering degree in 1969 from Yokohama National University (Applied Chemistry), Yokohama. He received a master's degree in physical chemistry at The University of Tokyo, in 1971. He received Doctor of Science in solid state chemistry in 1978 for submitted thesis from The University of Tokyo, entitled “Electrical Properties and Defect Structures of Iron Hydroxide Oxide

Colloids”.

Education 
He worked in Chiba University as a faculty of science until 2010, later he studied surface chemistry of metal hydroxide oxides and on gas adsorption, nanoporous materials, and nanospaces molecular science. Later, he became the dean of faculty of science and graduate school of science and technology of Chiba University.

He is now a distinguished professor of Shinshu University since 2010.

Research and career 
He developed accurate characterization method of nanoscale pores with gas adsorption and established new nanospaces-molecular science; he found unusual in-pore high pressure effect of nanoscale pores in which molecules and/or atoms prefer to form high pressure phase even without compression. One representative example of the in-pore high pressure effect is spontaneous formation of atomically 1D sulfur-chain of metallic property inside carbon nanotube under vacuum. Also he found partial dehydration of ions by confinement of ions in nanoscale pores, being essential to understand the supercapacitors.

He gave a reasonable clue, cluster- associated hydrophobic-to-hydrophilic transformation, to understand water adsorption of nanoporous carbons of hydrophobicity hydration. He contributed to understand adsorption of supercritical gases such as NO, CH4 , and H2 on nanoporous materials. He introduced the concept of quasi-vaporization of supercritical gases through an intensive molecule-pore interaction, giving an efficient guideline for improving adsorption of supercritical gases. He has developed an efficient separation route of isotopic gases such as 18O2 and 16O2. He evidenced partial breaking of Coulombic law in electrically conductive carbon pores to induce association of cations or anions. He developed a sol-gel dispersant of single wall carbon nanotube, producing highly transparent conductive films and stretchable electrodes.

Awards and honors 
He was awarded by Chemical Society of Japan in 1999 and the Charles Petinos Award by the American Carbon Society in 2007. He is fellow of Chemical Society of Japan since 2011, Royal Society of Chemistry and International Adsorption Society since 2013, and a Senior Member of the AIChE.

Publications

References 

Shinshu University alumni
Fellows of the Royal Society of Chemistry
Yokohama National University alumni
Academic staff of Chiba University
Japanese chemists
Living people
Year of birth missing (living people)
Solid state chemists